The African IXP Association, or Af-IX, is an association of African Internet exchange points. It is a community-driven association serving African Internet exchange points and Internet service providers and the general IP community, including politicians, regulators, and other industry related sectors. Af-IX is part of the global IX-F Internet eXchange Federation.  Membership in Af-IX is free, and open to all operators of Internet Exchange Points in Africa.

Meetings
The Af-IX normally meets twice annually, during the African Internet Summit (AIS),  and again during the African Peering and Interconnect Forum (AfPIF).

See also
List of Internet exchange points

References

External links
 Official website

Internet in Africa
Internet exchange points
Pan-African organizations